Doubtful Islands are a group of three small islands located approximately  offshore of Point Hood and approximately  east of Bremer Bay in Western Australia.

The islands were named by George Vancouver in 1791, the name derived from his being doubtful that these were islands at all. Matthew Flinders confirmed that the group were islands in 1802 while on expedition in the area.

Two whaling stations were established around the islands in 1837, one by George Cheyne and the other by Thomas Booker Sherratt.

John Thomas, the owner of a whaling fleet based at Cheyne Beach, often hunted for right whales around Doubtful Islands in October and November in the early 1860s. Another whaler named John MacKenzie lost two of his crew off Doubtful Islands when attacked by a small whale.

In 2003, nine badly gashed sperm whales were washed up on reefs near the island. Six of the whales were dead and the others had to be euthanised.

New Zealand fur seals are known to inhabit the island although the population has nearly halved between 1999 and 2011 despite an overall population increase along the south coast of Western Australia.

References

Nature reserves in Western Australia
Islands of the Great Southern (Western Australia)
Whaling stations in Australia